Petar Patsev (born 21 October 1957) is a Bulgarian rower. He competed in the men's eight event at the 1980 Summer Olympics.

References

1957 births
Living people
Bulgarian male rowers
Olympic rowers of Bulgaria
Rowers at the 1980 Summer Olympics
Place of birth missing (living people)